Giacobbi is a surname and may refer to:

 Girolamo Giacobbi (1567–c.1629), Italian choirmaster, conductor, and composer
 Marius Giacobbi (1846–1919), French lawyer who was deputy or senator for Corsica 
 Paul Giacobbi (born 1957), French deputy until 2017